Ever After may refer to:

 Ever After (or Ever After: A Cinderella Story), a 1998 American film starring Drew Barrymore and Anjelica Huston
 Ever After (musical), a 2015 musical adaptation starring Christine Ebersole
 Ever After (The Three O'Clock album), the 2nd studio album by American alternative rock group The Three O'Clock
 Ever After (The Mission album), a 2000 live album by UK band The Mission
 Ever After (Fayray album), the 2nd studio album by Japanese singer songwriter Fayray
 Ever After (Marianas Trench album), the 3rd studio album from Canadian band Marianas Trench
 Ever After, a web comic by Shaun Healey hosted by Snafu Comics
 Ever After, a novel by Graham Swift
 Ever After, the name of the demon realm in and one of the books of the Hollows series by Kim Harrison
 "Ever After", the debut single by Gabi DeMartino
"Ever After", a song by Neil Young from Chrome Dreams II
 Either or all of afterlife, eternity, immortality

See also
 Ever After High
 Happily Ever After (disambiguation)
 Happy Ever After (disambiguation)